S. Muthuselvi is an Indian politician and was a member of the Tamil Nadu Legislative Assembly from the Sankarankoil Constituency. She represents the All India Anna Dravida Munnetra Kazhagam party.

She has completed B.E ( Electronics & Instrumentation Engineering ) from The Rajaas Engineering College - Vadakkankulam.

She is the daughter of Former Sankarankoil MLA S. Sankaralingam.

References 

Tamil Nadu MLAs 2011–2016
All India Anna Dravida Munnetra Kazhagam politicians
Living people
21st-century Indian women politicians
21st-century Indian politicians
Year of birth missing (living people)
Women members of the Tamil Nadu Legislative Assembly